Chaoborus edulis is a species of phantom midges (flies in the family Chaoboridae). Colloquially, the larval stage is termed a glassworm.

References

Chaoboridae
Insects described in 1930